Wallhalben is a municipality in the Südwestpfalz district, in Rhineland-Palatinate, Germany. It is situated approximately 15 km northwest of Pirmasens, and 15 km northeast of Zweibrücken.

Until 1 July 2014, when it became part of the Verbandsgemeinde ("collective municipality") Thaleischweiler-Wallhalben, Wallhalben was the seat of the Verbandsgemeinde Wallhalben.

References

Südwestpfalz